The 2023–24 season will be the 99th season in existence of Olympiacos and the club's 65th consecutive season in the top flight of Greek football. In addition to the Greek Super League, Olympiacos will be participating in this season's Greek Cup, UEFA Champions League. The season covers the period from June 2023 to late May 2024.

Players

First team

Out on loan

Backroom staff

Coaching staff

Transfers

In

 Total Spending: €0.0M

Out

 Total Income: €0.0M

Net Income:  €0.0M

Friendlies

Competitions

Overview

Super League Greece

League table

Results summary

Results by matchday

Regular season matches

Greek Football Cup

Round of 16

Quarter-finals

UEFA Champions League

Second qualifying round

Squad statistics

Appearances

Goalscorers 

Own goals: 1

References

External links

Olympiacos F.C. seasons